The Driskos Tunnel is a 4.5 kilometres long tunnel on the Egnatia Odos motorway. It passes underneath the Mitsikeli mountain. Works began in 2001 as part of the Ioannina-Arachthos segment of the motorway, one of its most challenging and costly segments. Its construction faced challenges, as it was built under a mountain containing sandstone. It is the longest road tunnel of the whole motorway and it was the longest in Greece, until the 6 kilometres long T2 Tunnel of the A1 Motorway completed in 2017.

References

Ioannina
Road tunnels in Greece
Tunnels completed in 2008
Transport in Greece
2008 establishments in Greece
Road tunnels